North East Delhi is one of the eleven administrative district of Delhi, India. The district was established in 1997. North East Delhi borders the Yamuna River on the west, Ghaziabad District to the north and east, East Delhi to the south, and North Delhi to the west across the Yamuna. Karawal Nagar, Seelampur and Yamuna Vihar are 3 sub-divisions of this district.

Demographics
According to the 2011 census, North East Delhi had a population of 2,241,624, roughly equal to the nation of Latvia, or the United States state of New Mexico. This gives it a ranking of 202nd in India (out of a total of 640). Its population growth rate over the decade 2001-2011 was 26.78%. North East Delhi has a sex ratio of 886 females for every 1000 males, and a literacy rate of 83.09%.

Assembly Constituencies 
Karawal Nagar
Mustafabad
Seelampur
Gokalpur
Burari
 Timarpur

Towns and villages
North East Delhi incorporates the following towns:
 Yamuna Vihar
 Ghonda
 Brahmpuri
 Zafrabad
 Moujpur
 Babarpur
 Dayal Pur
 Karawal Nagar
 Gokal Pur
 Sonia Vihar
 Mandoli
 Saboli
 Nand Nagri
 Sunder Nagri
 Seemapuri
 Gautampuri
 Dilshad Garden
 Jiwan Pur (Johri Pur)
 Khajoori Khas
 Tukmeerpur
 Mustafabad
 Sadat Pur Gujran
 Brij Puri
 New Usmanpur
 Bhajanpura
 Ashok Nagar
 Harsh Vihar 
 Shiv Vihar 

Villages in North East Delhi are divided into three administrative villages:
Shahdara with no sub-villages, Seema Purl with one sub village, Mandoli, and Seelam Pur with twelve sub-villages: 
 Badar Pur Khadar
 Pur Delhi
 Pur Shahdara
 Sabhapur Delhi
 Sabhapur Shahdara
 Baqiabad
 Sadat Pur 
 Bihari Pur
 SHERPUR 
 Garhi Mendu
 Tukhmir Pur
 Khan Pur Dhani

See also
List of districts of Delhi

References

External links
North East Delhi official website
East Delhi Information Portal

Minority Concentrated Districts in India
1997 establishments in Delhi
Districts of Delhi